Xuyong County is a county in the southeast of Sichuan Province, China, bordering the provinces of Guizhou to the south and Yunnan to the west. It is under the administration of the prefecture-level city of Luzhou.

Climate

See also
Luzhou

References

External links
Xuyong County Government website

County-level divisions of Sichuan
Luzhou